Chen Kunshu (died May 1864), prominent military leader of the Taiping Rebellion, and known during his military tenure as the King of Hu (護王) (means Prince Protector). He led Taiping forces to many military victories especially the Second rout the Army Group Jiangnan. He was executed by Li Hongzhang after interrogation in 1864, Chen was an important General and was the sole person responsible for the late-Taiping Rebellion.

Li Hongzhang used Chen to balance Li Xiucheng's power, which was originally justified, but grew too large.

Wins
Eastern campaign
Second rout the Army Group Jiangnan (1860):
26 May:occupied Changzhou
30 May:occupied Wuxi
2 June:occupied Suzhou
13 June:occupied Wujiang, Jiangsu
15 June:occupied Jiaxing
It made Zeng Guofan offer a reward of 50,000 silver tael to arrest alive Chen and death 25,000 tael(then a soldier salary was 2 silver tael one month ).

Battle of Shanghai (1861—1863)
Battle of Cixi(1862)
 
Western campaign
Battle of Sanhe(1858)

1864 deaths
Military leaders of the Taiping Rebellion
Executed Taiping Heavenly Kingdom people
People from Guigang
1820 births
People executed by the Qing dynasty
People executed by flaying
Executed people from Guangxi
19th-century executions by China